Masorti on Campus (MoC) is a student organization for Conservative Judaism (also known as "Masorti") on North American college and university campuses, working with Hillel and other Jewish campus life organizations. MoC connects students and Jewish professionals from different campuses to share ideas for building and strengthening progressive Jewish communities.

History
Masorti on Campus was launched in July 2013 by Eric Leiderman and Douglas Kandl in response to the closing of Koach by the United Synagogue of Conservative Judaism. Gaining the support of the Jewish Theological Seminary of America (JTS), MoC began its campaign to create a network for existing campus communities. In February 2014, the Seminary, along with Columbia University, hosted a student leadership conference. In order to further connect students and build new communities Masorti on Campus announced a second conference with an expanded reach; speakers included the President of Hillel: The Foundation for Jewish Campus Life. One of the first campus communities to join was Rutgers University.

List of Shabbatonim 
Masorti on Campus signature program is an international student leadership conference.

See also
 Camp Ramah
 Nativ College Leadership Program in Israel
 United Synagogue of Conservative Judaism
 United Synagogue Youth

References

External links

Conservative Judaism in the United States
Student religious organizations in the United States
2013 establishments in New York (state)
Student organizations established in 2013
Religious organizations established in 2013